Haricharan Shaw (born 1922) is an Indian former sports shooter. He competed in the 50 metre rifle, three positions event at the 1956 Summer Olympics.

References

External links
 

1922 births
Possibly living people
Sportspeople from Kolkata
Indian male sport shooters
Olympic shooters of India
Shooters at the 1956 Summer Olympics